Uwe Müller (born 16 October 1963 in Langenselbold) is a German former professional football player.

He appeared in 131 German Bundesliga fixtures for Eintracht Frankfurt and scored 18 goals. In the Austrian Bundesliga, he was fielded 235 times for FC Admira/Wacker and Austria Wien.

Since 2002, he works in the football academy of Eintracht Frankfurt.

References

External links 

1963 births
Living people
German footballers
Eintracht Frankfurt players
Bundesliga players
Germany under-21 international footballers
FC Admira Wacker Mödling players
Austrian Football Bundesliga players
FK Austria Wien players
Eintracht Frankfurt non-playing staff
Association football midfielders